The molecular formula C26H32N2O5 (molar mass: 452.54 g/mol, exact mass: 452.2311 u) may refer to:

 Ensaculin (KA-672)
 Delapril

Molecular formulas